The Maduran leaf-nosed bat (Hipposideros madurae) is a species of bat in the family Hipposideridae endemic to Indonesia.
This species is known from the eastern half of Java and on Madura Island. It is found below . It is an IUCN Red List Near Threatened species, with the status changed from Least Concern after a 2021 assessment.

Taxonomy and etymology
It was described as a new species in 1993 by Kitchener and Maryanto. Its species name "madurae" was derived from Madura Island where the holotype was collected.

References

Maduran leaf-nosed bat
Maduran leaf-nosed bat
Endemic fauna of Indonesia
Fauna of Java
Maduran leaf-nosed bat
Near threatened animals
Near threatened biota of Asia
Maduran leaf-nosed bat
Maduran leaf-nosed bat
Taxonomy articles created by Polbot